Physogyne is a genus of flowering plants from the orchid family, Orchidaceae. It contains three known species, all endemic to Mexico.

Physogyne garayana R.González & Szlach. - Colima
Physogyne gonzalezii (L.O.Williams) Garay - Colima, Nayarit, Jalisco
Physogyne sparsiflora (C.Schweinf.) Garay - Morelos, Jalisco

See also 
 List of Orchidaceae genera

References 

 Berg Pana, H. 2005. Handbuch der Orchideen-Namen. Dictionary of Orchid Names. Dizionario dei nomi delle orchidee. Ulmer, Stuttgart

External links 

Orchids of Mexico
Cranichideae genera
Spiranthinae